Deoxycytidylate kinase may refer to one of two enzymes:
(d)CMP kinase
Cytidylate kinase